Steady Groovin': The Blue Note Groove Sides is a compilation album by jazz musician John Scofield. The album consists of recordings Scofield made as a Blue Note artist, and were recorded from November 1989 until June 1995.

Musicians
This John Scofield album consists of John Scofield (guitar); Eddie Harris, Billy Drewes, Joe Lovano (tenor saxophone); Howard Johnson (baritone saxophone, tuba, bass clarinet); Randy Brecker (trumpet, flugelhorn); John Clark (French horn); Jim Pugh, Steve Turre (trombone); Larry Goldings (Organ); Bill Frisell (guitar); Dennis Irwin, Charlie Haden, Marc Johnson (bass); Bill Stewart, Idris Muhammad, Jack DeJohnette, Joey Baron (drums); Don Alias (percussion).

The tracks on this album were digitally remastered by Odea Murphy (Capitol Studios, Los Angeles, California).

Track listing

References 

2000 greatest hits albums
John Scofield compilation albums
Blue Note Records compilation albums